Édouard Roditi (6 June 1910 in Paris, France – 10 May 1992 in Cadiz, Spain) was an American poet, short-story writer, critic and translator.

Literary career
A prolific writer, Édouard Roditi published numerous volumes of poetry, short stories, and art criticism starting with Poems for F (Paris: , 1935). He was also well regarded as a translator, rendering into English original works from French, German, Spanish, Danish, Portuguese and Turkish. He was, for instance, one of the first to translate the work of French poet Saint-John Perse into English, in a volume published in 1944.

In 1961, he translated Yaşar Kemal's epic novel İnce Memed (1955) under the English title Memed, My Hawk. This book was instrumental in introducing the famed Turkish writer to the English-speaking world. Memed, My Hawk is still in print. Roditi was a cousin of Kemal's wife, Thilda Serrero. Roditi also translated Robert Schmutzler's Art Nouveau (1964) into English, in an edition that is still in print. He also translated such authors as C.P. Cavafy, Paul Celan, Albert Memmi, Fernando Pessoa.

In addition to his poetry and translations, Roditi is perhaps best remembered for the numerous interviews he conducted with modernist artists, including Marc Chagall, Joan Miró, Oskar Kokoschka, Philippe Derome and Hannah Höch. Several of these have been assembled in the collection Dialogues on Art.

Reflecting his wide reading of works on sexuality as well as his personal experience, Roditi also published a book-length essay in French on homosexuality titled De l'homosexualité (Paris: Société des Éditions Modernes/SEDIMO, 1962). The work assesses historical, sociological, religious, medical, legal and literary approaches to the subject; it closes with a seven-page bibliography of sources in French, English and German.

Upbringing, schooling & early jobs
Édouard Roditi's father was a Sephardi Jew from Istanbul who became an American citizen. His mother was of Ashkenazi and Flemish Catholic descent, and a British citizen. He was born in Paris, where his parents had already been living for a number of years.

Roditi grew up in France and attended public school there before going on to study in England at Elstree School, Charterhouse and briefly at Balliol College, Oxford. In 1929, he moved back to Paris, where he frequented the proponents of Surrealism and became a partner in the Surrealist publishing house Éditions du Saggitaire. During this period, he visited the celebrated salon of Gertrude Stein, whom he found "incredibly pretentious" and "rather offensive."

Roditi traveled to the United States in 1929 and 1932, meeting members of the Harlem Renaissance as well as novelist and photographer Carl van Vechten. He returned in 1937 to take a bachelor's degree in Romance languages at the University of Chicago, then went on to do graduate work at the University of California, Berkeley. During World War II, he served in the French short-wave broadcast unit of the United States Office of War Information and as a translator for the State Department and the Defense Department.

Following the war, he served as a multilingual interpreter for the United Nations Charter Conference in San Francisco. He subsequently returned to Europe to work as a freelance interpreter for international organizations and conferences, including the International War Crimes Tribunal at Nuremberg. In 1950, during the "Lavender Scare", he was fired from that job. Roditi was part of the Benton Way Group with Charles Aufderheide.

Personal life
Édouard Roditi had recognized that he was attracted to other men from an early age, and he actively explored the homosexual milieu of dance halls, bars, bathhouses and public cruising areas in Paris starting in his teen years and continuing in other places where he lived thereafter.

Among Roditi's close friends in France in the early 1930s was the American homosexual poet Hart Crane. In the United States in the late 1930s, Roditi befriended a fellow gay Jewish writer Paul Goodman.

Roditi's first book, Poems for F., printed in 250 copies in 1935, was inspired by a two-year affair with a married man, probably an Austrian painter, 20 years older than the poet. Roditi kept the identity of F. secret to the end of his life.

In his romantic life, Roditi followed an early-20th-century pattern of seeking out partners among men who did not identify as gay. In a 1984 interview, he recalled, "Personally, I have never been particularly attracted to outright homosexuals, and most of my more enjoyable and lasting relationships have been with bisexual or otherwise normal men in whose love life I was an exception."

He considered himself "thrice chosen" by being Jewish, homosexual, and epileptic, as expressed in his anthology titled Thrice Chosen (1981).

Published works

 Poems for F. Paris, Éditions du Sagittaire, 1935.
 Prison Within Prison. Three Elegies on Hebrew Themes. Prairie City, Press of James A. Decker, 1941. (German Translation : Drei Hebraïsche Elegien. Deutsche ubersetzung von Alexander Koval. Berlin, Karl H. Henssel Verlag, 1950).
 Pieces of Three. With Paul Goodman & Meyer Liben. New Jersey, 5 x 8 Press, 1942.
 Oscar Wilde. New York, New Directions, 1947. New Revised edition. New York, New Directions, 1986. (German trans. Alexander Koval. Munich, Verlag Herbert Kluger, 1947.)
 Poems. 1928-1948. New York, New Directions, 1949.
 Selbstanalyse eines Sammlers. Cologne, Verlag Galerie der Spiegel, 1960.
 In Erdnähe (Close to earth). Poems by Roditi, etchings by Heinz Trökes. In German, English and French. Cologne, Verlag Galerie der Spiegel, 1960.
 Dialogues on Art. London, Martin Secker & Warburg, 1960.
 Dialogues on Art. Santa Barbara, Ross-Erikson, 1980. Includes Marc Chagall, Marino Marini, Giorgio Morandi, Joan Miró, Oskar Kokoschka, Barbara Hepworth, Pavel Tchelitchew, Gabrièle Münter, Eduardo Paolozzi, Josef Hermann, Henry Moore, Fahr-el-Nissa Zeid.
 More Dialogues on Art. Santa Barbara, Ross-Ekrikson, 1984. Includes Victor Brauner, Carlo Carra, Max Ernst, Leonore Fini, Demetrios Galanis, Nicolas Ghika, Hannah Höch, Mordercai Moreh, Ianni Tsarouchis, Jef Van Hoof, Ossip Zadkine, Alexander Zlotnik.
 De L'Homosexualité. Préf. G. Valensin. Paris, Sedimo, 1962. (Spanish translation : La Inversion Sexual. Trans. Alberto Santalo. Barcelona, Ediciones Picazo, 1975).
 Le journal d'un ahuri. Ou le maquereau malgé lui. Châtelet (Belgium), Imprimeur Franz Jacob, 1962.
 Propos sur l'Art. Chagall, Miro, Max Ernst. Paris, Sedimo, 1967.
 Propos sur l'Art. Propos recueillis par Édouard Roditi. Miro. Ernst. Chagall. Paris, Hermann Editeurs, 2006.
 An Earthly Paradise + Present Indicative. With From the Notebook of Marco Gillette + Park Street Under by Richard Dean Rosen. Rhode Island, Hellcoal Press, 1968.
 New Hieroglyphic Tales. Prose Poems. Drawings Modesto Roldan; San Francisco, Kayak Press, 1968.
 Joachim Karsch. Berlin, Mann, 1968.
 La sultana de los desmazalados. Trans. Amadeo Solé-Leris. Madrid, Papelos de son Armadans, 1969.
 Habacuc. Traduit de l'anglais par Alain Bosquet. Gravure Albert Bitran. Paris, Imprimerie S.M.I., 1972.
 Magelan of the Pacific. London, Faber & Faber, 1972. (American edition : New York, McGraw-Hill, 1972).
 Emperor of Midnight. Illustration José Hernandez. Los Angeles, Black Sparrow Press, 1974.
 The Disorderly Poet and Other Essays. Santa Barbara, Capra Press, 1975.
 The Delights of Turkey. Twenty Tales. New York, New Directions, 1977. (Turkish translation : Türkiye Tatlari. Trans. Sevin Okyay. Istanbul, Yapi Kredi, 1999).
 Meetings with Conrad. Los Angeles, Press of the Pegacycle Lady. 1977.
 In a Lost World. Los Angeles, Black Sparrow Press, 1978.
 The Temptations of a Saint. Illustrations Jose Hernandez. California, Ettan Press, 1980.
 Thrice Chosen. Foreword. Paul Goodman. Black Sparrow Press, 1981
 Etre un Autre. Poèmes. Illus. Manuel Cargaleiro. Lisbon, Isaac Holly, 1982
 Fabelter. Illus. Manuel Cargaleiro. Paris & Lisbon, Isaac Holly, 1982.
 New Old and New Testaments. New York, Red Ozier Press, 1983.
 Orphic Love. New York, Hydra Group, 1986.
 Propos sur l'Art. Paris, José Corti, 1987.
 Jef Van Hoof. Brussels, Les Editeurs d'Art Associes, 1989.
 Dialogues. Conversations with European Artists at Mid-Century. London, Lund Humphries, 1990. Includes Victor Brauner, Carlo Carra, Marc Chagall, Max Ernst, Barbara Hepworth, Josef Hermann, Hannah Höch, Oskar Kokoschka, Marino Marini, Gabrièle Münter, Ettore Sottsass, Pavel Tschelitchev and Ossip Zadkine.
 The Journal of an Apprentice Cabbalist. Newcastle upon Tyne, Cloud, 1991.
 Choose Your Own World. Illus. Yüksel Arslan. Santa Maria, Asylum Arts, 1992.

Journal articles

References
 Michael Neal's Édouard Roditi Archive. Cayeux-sur-Mer. France.
 Edouard Roditi, "Éloges and other poems, Saint-John Perse", Contemporary Poetry, Baltimore, vol. IV, no. 3, Autumn 1944

 Edouard Roditi, Inventions and Imitations: Tradition and the Advanced Guard in the Work of Edouard Roditi. Interviewer, Richard Candida Smith. Oral History Program, University of California, Los Angeles. 1986.

External links
Article in the GLBTQ encyclopedia
Saint-John Perse
Edouard Roditi Papers, 1910-1992, at the Charles E. Young Research Library, University of California Los Angeles.
Guide to the Papers of Edouard Roditi (1910-1992) at the Leo Baeck Institute, New York.

1910 births
1992 deaths
People educated at Charterhouse School
Alumni of Balliol College, Oxford
American people of Turkish-Jewish descent
Jewish American poets
American LGBT poets
French–English translators
German–English translators
Danish–English translators
Turkish–English translators
Spanish–English translators
20th-century American poets
20th-century American translators
American male poets
20th-century American male writers
20th-century American Jews
20th-century LGBT people
French expatriates in the United Kingdom
French emigrants to the United States